Chisocheton crustularii is a tree in the family Meliaceae. The bark is greyish. The flowers are white. The specific epithet  is from the Latin meaning "pastry maker", referring to the tart-shaped flower disc. Habitat is rain forest. C. crustularii is endemic to Borneo and known only from Sarawak.

References

crustularii
Endemic flora of Borneo
Trees of Borneo
Flora of Sarawak
Plants described in 1979